Arman Hossain (born 22 June 1983) is a Bangladeshi cricketer. He played sixteen first-class and fourteen List A matches between 2007 and 2014. He was also part of Bangladesh's squad for the 2000 Under-19 Cricket World Cup.

References

External links
 

1983 births
Living people
Bangladeshi cricketers
Dhaka Division cricketers
Cricketers from Dhaka